Alzira Rufino (born July 6, 1949) is a Brazilian feminist and activist who is associated with the Black Movement and the Black Women's Movement. She was the founder of the Casa de Cultura da Mulher Negra (Black Women's House of Culture), the country's first black women's centre.

Rufino was born in Santos, São Paulo to a low-income family and worked as a child. She won her first literary prize in her youth. At age 19, she began her studies in healthcare, later graduating from nursing school.

In 2005, she was one of 52 Brazilian women nominated for the 1000 Women Project for the Nobel Peace Prize 2005.

Rufinois a leader in the Afro-Brazilian literature and cultural arts movement. In 1990, she founded Casa de Cultura da Mulher Negra (Black Women's House of Culture), the country's first black women's centre.

Selected works
 Violência Doméstica e Racial 
 Direitos Humanos das Mulheres Negras
 Educação Anti-racista
 Comunicação
 Cultura Afro-brasileira

References

Living people
1949 births
People from Santos, São Paulo
Brazilian nurses
Brazilian women writers
Brazilian non-fiction writers
Brazilian feminists
Brazilian religious leaders
Brazilian songwriters
Brazilian human rights activists
Organization founders
Women founders